4-HO-DsBT (4-hydroxy-N,N-di-sec-butyltryptamine) is a tryptamine derivative which acts as a serotonin receptor agonist. It was first made by Alexander Shulgin and is mentioned in his book TiHKAL, but was never tested by him. However it has subsequently been tested in vitro and unlike the n-butyl and isobutyl isomers which are much weaker, the s-butyl derivative retains reasonable potency, with a similar 5-HT2A receptor affinity to MiPT but better selectivity over the 5-HT1A and 5-HT2B subtypes.

See also 
 4-HO-DiPT
 4-HO-DBT
 4-HO-McPeT
 4-HO-PiPT
 5-MeO-DBT
 Dibutyltryptamine
 N-t-Butyltryptamine
 Robalzotan

References 

Tryptamines